Denmark was represented by Raquel Rastenni, with the song "Jeg rev et blad ud af min dagbog", at the 1958 Eurovision Song Contest, which took place on 12 March in Hilversum, Netherlands. "Jeg rev et blad ud af min dagbog" was chosen as the Danish entry at the Dansk Melodi Grand Prix on 16 February 1958.

Before Eurovision

Dansk Melodi Grand Prix 1958 
The event was held on 16 February 1958 at Radiohuset in Copenhagen, hosted by Volmer Sørensen. The winning song was chosen by a jury of 10 people and only the winning song was announced.

At Eurovision 

On the night "Jeg rev et blad ud af min dagbog" was conducted by Kai Mortensen and performed sixth in the running order, following  and preceding . At the close of voting "Jeg Rev Et Blad Ud Af Min Dagbog" had received 3 points, placing Denmark eighth of the 10 entries. It was succeeded as Danish representative at the 1959 contest by Birthe Wilke with "Uh, jeg ville ønske jeg var dig".

Voting 
Every country had a jury of ten people. Every jury member could give one point to his or her favourite song.

References

Danish National Final 1958 - Geocities.com

1958
Countries in the Eurovision Song Contest 1958
Eurovision

da:Dansk Melodi Grand Prix 1958
fo:Dansk Melodi Grand Prix 1958